The Mahisapala Dynasty was a dynasty established by Abhira that ruled the Kathmandu Valley. They were also known as Mahispalbanshi. They took control of Nepal after replacing the Gopala dynasty. The Gopalas and the Mahisapalas were together known as Abhiras. Three kings of Mahisapala dynasty ruled the valley before they were overthrown by the Kirata dynasty.

List of Rulers
Bada Simha
Jayamati Simha
Bhuban Simha

See also
Gopala Dynasty

References 

Archaeology of Nepal
Dynasties of Nepal
Ancient Nepal
8th-century BC disestablishments